The 2018–19 season was Elche Club de Fútbol's 96th season in existence and the club's fourth consecutive season in the second division of Spanish football. In addition to the domestic league, Elche participated in this season's edition of the Copa del Rey. The season covers the period from 1 July 2018 to 30 June 2019.

Players

Current squad
.

Reserve team

Out on loan

Transfers

In

Out

Pre-season and friendlies

Competitions

Overview

Segunda División

League table

Results summary

Results by round

Matches
The league fixtures were announced on 24 July 2018.

Copa del Rey

Statistics

Goalscorers

Clean sheets

References

External links

Elche CF seasons
Elche